The Dudhaganga (or Dudhganga, Doodhganga) is a right bank tributary river of the Krishna in western India. It rises in kolhapur district of Maharashtra in the Western Ghats and flows eastward through Kolhapur district and  Belgaum district in Karnataka before joining the Krishna. In parts of its course it forms part of the boundary between Karnataka and Maharashtra.

The river is dammed to form the Kalammawadi reservoir in the west of Kohlapur district.

References
 Maharashtra State Gazetteer .

Rivers of Maharashtra
Rivers of Karnataka
Geography of Belagavi district
Rivers of India